Dehnow Kashkuli (also Romanized as Dehnow Kashkūlī; also known as Kashkūlī) is a village in Shapur Rural District, in the Central District of Kazerun County, Fars Province, Iran. At the 2006 census, its population was 243, in 40 families.

References 

Populated places in Kazerun County